Sir William Russell, 1st Baronet may refer to:

 Sir William Russell, 1st Baronet, of Chippenham (died 1654), English politician
 Sir William Russell, 1st Baronet, of Wytley ( – 1669), English politician
 Sir William Russell, 1st Baronet, of Charlton Park (1773–1839), Scottish physician

See also
 William Russell (disambiguation)
 Sir William Russell, 2nd Baronet